San Emigdio Mountain is in the San Emigdio Mountains, located in Kern County, a few miles north of the Ventura County border in Southern California.

San Emigdio Mountain is part of the southern wall of the San Joaquin Valley, in the Los Padres National Forest. It is near Frazier Mountain, northwest of the community of Pine Mountain Club, and to the west of Interstate 5 and the Tehachapi Mountains.

References 

San Emigdio Mountains
Mountains of Kern County, California
Los Padres National Forest
Mountains of Southern California